Te Contei? is a Brazilian telenovela produced and broadcast by TV Globo. It premiered on 6 March 1978 and ended on 1 September 1978, with a total of 155 episodes. It's the twenty first "novela das sete" to be aired at the timeslot. It is created by  Cassiano Gabus Mendes and directed by Régis Cardoso with Dennis Carvalho.

Cast

References

External links 
 

1978 telenovelas
TV Globo telenovelas
Brazilian telenovelas
1978 Brazilian television series debuts
1979 Brazilian television series endings
Portuguese-language telenovelas